John Crown & Sons Ltd, was a British shipbuilding company founded in 1847 and based on the River Wear, Sunderland.

History
In its centenary year the shipyard was acquired by J.L. Thompson & Sons

Ships built by John Crown & Sons Ltd

See also
 List of shipbuilders and shipyards

Shipbuilding companies of the City of Sunderland
Defunct shipbuilding companies of the United Kingdom
Former defence companies of the United Kingdom
Defunct companies of England

Manufacturing companies established in 1847
Manufacturing companies disestablished in 1947
1847 establishments in England
1947 disestablishments in England
British companies disestablished in 1947
British companies established in 1847